The Battle of Chandannagar was a successful attack on the French-held settlement of Chandernagore by a British force under the command of Robert Clive and Charles Watson on 23 March 1757 during the Seven Years' War. Chandernagore remained under military occupation by the British until the signing of the Treaty of Paris in 1763, which brought an end to the war.

Background 

Lying ten miles up the Hooghly River from Calcutta, Chandernagore was the administrative centre of the French East India Company. British East India Company officer Robert Clive, "determined to eliminate" the Nawab of Bengal, decided to capture Chandernagore as a preliminary step. The French fortifications at Chandernagore was equipped with only sixteen artillery pieces compared to the force Clive led to attack Chandernagore, which included three Royal Navy ships of the line, the Kent, Tiger, and Salisbury under the command of Charles Watson in addition to Clive's land forces.

Battle 
Though "the guns of the fort did a great deal of damage", including casualties amounting to 37 killed and 74 wounded on the Tiger, the British attack was successful. In order to capture the French fortifications guarding the town,  Kent and Tiger managed to edge up the Hooghly River, although the French had tried to block their passage with scuttled ships and river chains. When they were close to the fort, they opened fire with all guns, but took a great punishment from the French artillery in the process.

Aftermath 

The town's fortifications and many houses were demolished thereafter, and Chandernagore's importance as a commercial centre was eclipsed by that of Calcutta just downriver. Chandannagar remained under military occupation by the British until the signing of the Treaty of Paris in 1763, which brought an end to the war; the treaty stipulated that Chandernagore would be restored to the French. The settlement was occupied by the British again in 1794 during the French Revolutionary Wars. The city was returned to France in 1816, along with a 3 sq mi (7.8 km2) enclave of surrounding territory. It was governed as part of French India until 1950, under the political control of the governor-general in Pondicherry.

Legacy 

The Battle of Chandannagar was one of the many fought between the French and British on the Indian subcontinent during the Seven Years' War. It gave the British effective control of Calcutta and the Bengal hinterland. The French who escaped took shelter with the Nawab, whom Clive shortly afterwards defeated at Plassey. Britain finished the war as the dominant European power in Colonial India, and was well-placed to take advantage of the weakening political and economic power of the Mughal Empire. Chandernagore's capture  was the first step in the British driving the French from Bengal.

References

Citations

Bibliography 
 

1757 in France
1757 in India
Battles involving the British East India Company
Battles involving the French East India Company
Battles of the East Indies Campaign (1757–1763)
History of West Bengal
Chandannagar
Conflicts in 1757
Third Carnatic War